The FAI Cup 2006 was the 86th staging of The Football Association of Ireland Challenge Cup or FAI Cup. This season's competition was the last to be sponsored by Carlsberg. It officially kicked off in late April, when twenty clubs from the junior and intermediate leagues battled it out for the chance to face League of Ireland opposition in the second round. The ten winners of those ties were joined in the second round by the 22 League of Ireland clubs. The competition ran until early December, with the final taking place on Sunday, December 3.

First round
Fixtures played weekend April 23

Waterford Crystal 4-1 	Garda AFC

Castlebar Celtic 5-1 	Fairview CYM

Ashtown Villa  2-2 Wayside Celtic

Tolka Rovers  1-3 	Carrigaline United

College Corinthians2-2 Blarney United

Brendanville 	        0-1 	Douglas Hall

Malahide United 1-1 Fanad United

Athenry 	        0-0 	Bangor Celtic

Killester United 	6-1 	St Mochtas

Crumlin United  0-0 Avondale United

Second round
Matches played on the weekend of Sunday, 28 May 2006.

Third round
Matches played on the weekend of Sunday, 27 August 2006.

Quarter-finals
Matches played on the weekend of Sunday, 1 October.

Replay

Semi-finals

Replay

Final
The 2006 FAI Cup Final was the last at the old Lansdowne Road.

External links
FAI Website

 
2006
2

lt:Airijos futbolo varžybos 2006 m.